Peggy Gaddis Dern (born Erolie Pearl Gaddis; March 5, 1895 - June 14, 1966) was an American writer of traditional romance novels, so-called "nurse novels," as well as racy pulp romance stories. Utilizing her actual surname as well as various pseudonyms, she was actively writing from the late 1930s up until the 1960s, ultimately producing dozens of books, perhaps even a couple hundred or more. Her primary literary identity was as Peggy Gaddis.

Life
Peggy Gaddis Dern was born Erolie Pearl Gaddis March 5, 1895 in Gaddistown, Georgia. She attended and graduated from Reinhardt College, and then worked editing periodicals, first in Atlanta and later New York City, where she edited movie fan magazines and racy pulp periodicals.  In 1931, she married John Sherman Dern, a member of a traveling minstrel group. Dern began her career writing for pulp magazines such as Breezy Stories and Love Story Magazine, usually under the pseudonym "Peggy Gaddis". Later, Dern moved on to writing paperback novels.

Dern worked six days a week and endeavored to write a minimum of 3,000 words a day. Typically, she produced a book approximately every three weeks. Of writing, she was quoted as saying, "It's a sort of drug, for which I hope no one ever finds a cure." Dern died in 1966 and was buried in Fellowship Primitive Baptist Church Cemetery in Tucker, Georgia.

Pseudonyms
Dern utilized her actual surname and nearly a dozen pseudonyms during her career. The majority of her books were published under the names Peggy Gaddis and Peggy Dern. Frequently used pseudonyms included Gail Jordan, Perry Lindsay, and Joan Sherman. Other pen names included Carolina Lee, Georgia Craig, James Clayford, as well as Roberta Courtland, Joan Tucker, Sylvia Erskine, and Luther Gordon.

Partial bibliography
 The Affairs of a Country Girl, Gail Jordan, Cameo, 1952 (Country Girl, 1954)
 The April Heart, Peggy Dern; Arcadia, 1959
 As Good As Married, Perry Lindsay, Phoenix, 1945
 At Granada Court, Peggy Dern, Arcadia, 1959, Wright Brown (UK), 1960 (Karen, Valentine, s.d.)
 At Ruby's Place, Joan Tucker, Cameo, 1952 (Waterfront Club, 1954), também em1956, como John Tucker, pela Venus
 The Babe in Arms, Perry Lindsay, Phoenix, 1943
 Back Home, Peggy Gaddis, Arcadia, 1950. Também pela Manor, Star (Austrália) e  5-Star (UK), 1972 (ou como “Reaching Out for Love”, Large Print, 1996)
 Backwoods Girl, Peggy Gaddis; Venus, 1954
 Bayou Nurse, Peggy Gaddis, Arcadia, 1964
 Beauty to Burn, Peggy Gaddis, Godwin, 1937
 Beloved Intruder, Peggy Dern, Arcadia, 1958
 Betsy Moran, Peggy Dern, Arcadia, 1964
 Beware of Romance, Roberta Courtland, Gramercy, 1948
 Coast Guard Girl, Georgia Craig, Arcadia, 1945
 Courtesan, Joan Sherman, Godwin, 1936 (publicado como Lulie, pela Handi-Book, 1949)
 Eileen Duggan, Peggy Gaddis, Arcadia, 1952
 Goodbye, My Heart, Peggy Dern, Arcadia, 1941
 Marriage Can Wait, James Clayford, Quarter, 1949
 Shanty Girl, Joan Tucker, Venus, 1953
 Satan's Gal, Carolina Lee, Handi, 1950
 Show Boat Girl, Roberta Courtland, Gramercy, 1940
 The Girl Next Door, Peggy Gaddis, Arcadia, 1949
 The Marryin'Kind, Roberta Courtland, Gramercy, 1947
 Young Doctor Merry, Peggy Gaddis, Arcadia, 1944
 Young Nurse, Sylvia Erskine, Cameo, 1952
 Wings on Her Heart, Roberta Courtland, Gramercy, 1942
 Winter Circus, Peggy Dern, Arcadia, 1943

References

1895 births
1966 deaths
20th-century American women writers
20th-century American novelists
American women novelists
Novelists from Georgia (U.S. state)
Reinhardt University alumni
People from Union County, Georgia
20th-century pseudonymous writers
Pseudonymous women writers
American romantic fiction novelists
Women romantic fiction writers